The 2015 Internationaux Féminins de la Vienne was a professional tennis tournament played on indoor hard courts. It was the nineteenth edition of the tournament and part of the 2015 ITF Women's Circuit, offering a total of $100,000 in prize money. It took place in Poitiers, France, on 26 October–1 November 2015.

Singles main draw entrants

Seeds 

 1 Rankings as of 19 October 2015

Other entrants 
The following players received wildcards into the singles main draw:
  Julie Coin
  Amandine Hesse
  Mathilde Johansson
  Alizé Lim

The following players received entry from the qualifying draw:
  Ekaterina Alexandrova
  Tamira Paszek
  Bernarda Pera
  Conny Perrin

The following player received entry by a lucky loser spot:
  Martina Caregaro

Champions

Singles

 Monica Niculescu def.  Pauline Parmentier, 7–5, 6–2

Doubles

 Andreea Mitu /  Monica Niculescu def.  Stéphanie Foretz /  Amandine Hesse, 6–7(5–7), 7–6(7–2), [10–8]

External links 
 2015 Internationaux Féminins de la Vienne at ITFtennis.com
  

2015 ITF Women's Circuit
Internationaux Féminins de la Vienne
2015 in French tennis